Yevgeni Viktorovich Zaytsev (born 18 March 1968) is a former Russian football player.

References

1968 births
Living people
Soviet footballers
Russian footballers
FC Fakel Voronezh players
Russian Premier League players
Place of birth missing (living people)
Association football forwards 
Association football midfielders